Johann Tobias Krebs (16 December 1718, Buttstädt – 6 April 1782, Grimma) was a German scholar of classical literature and Hebrew literature. He wrote Decreta Romanorum pro Judaeis facta e Iosepho collecta et commentario historico-grammatico-critico illustrata, based on Josephus. He was also an editor of Hesiod (1746).

He was rector of Grimma. He was a pupil of Johann August Ernesti.

References
Sandys, J.E. A History of Classical Scholarship, 1908, p. 14.
Sowerby, E.M. Catalogue of the Library of Thomas Jefferson, 1952, v. 1, p. 5.

1718 births
1782 deaths
People from Buttstädt
Literary scholars
German Hebraists
18th-century German male writers